States of Malaya has a number of possible meanings:

 The Malayan Union, a British colony consisting of all states in Malaya except the settlements of Malacca, Dinding, Penang and Singapore which were part of the British colony of the Straits Settlements
 The Federation of Malaya, the successor state to the Malayan Union and the Straits Settlements
 The Malay states, divided into the Federated Malay States and the Unfederated Malay States
 The States of Johore, Kedah, Kelantan, Malacca, Negri Sembilan, Pahang, Penang, Perak, Perlis, Selangor and Trengganu; and the Federal Territories of Kuala Lumpur and Putrajaya which constitute part of Malaysia. (also known as Peninsular Malaysia)

Other uses 
 In the Interpretation Act 1965 of the Republic of Singapore, the States of Malaya and Singapore are collectively known as Malaya.

References

Malaya
Peninsular Malaysia
Malay Peninsula